Jade Elizabeth Konkel-Roberts is a professional rugby union player who plays her club rugby with Harlequins Women in the Allianz Premier 15s. She is a Number 8 and has represented the Scottish national team since 2013.

Club career 
After moving to Glasgow to attend university, Konkel played for Hillhead Jordanhill Rugby Football Club. It was while at the club that she made history by becoming Scottish Rugby's first full-time female player in the summer of 2016.

Konkel joined French club Lille Metropole Rugby Club Villeneuvois (LMRCV) ahead of season 2017/18 while still remaining a Stage 3 supported player in Scottish Rugby's Academy.

She left Lille for London-based side Harlequins ahead of the 2018/19 season and plays in the Tyrrells Premier 15s. Konkel is a Scottish Rugby 2021 supported player – a series of contracts designed to support players as the Scottish national side seeks to qualify for the 2021 World Cup in New Zealand.

International career 
Konkel made her Scotland Women debut against England on 2 February 2013 when she came on as a replacement for Mary Lafaiki in the first game of the 2013 Women's Six Nations at Molesey Road, Surrey.

Her first try for her country came in 2015 when she scored against Italy in the Six Nations clash at Broadwood Stadium.

Konkel-Roberts was included in Scotlands squad for the 2021 World Cup in New Zealand (which took place in 2022 due to COVID), She started all three games

Playing style 
Konkel is known as a hard carrying, physical player. In the opening rounds of the 2020 Six Nations, she carried a combined 55 times (away to Ireland and versus England at BT Murrayfield) which was over 20 carries more than any other player over the first two rounds of the tournament

Education 
Konkel graduated from Glasgow Caledonian University with a DipHE in Social Work in 2017

Other sports 
Konkel played basketball for Highland Bears and had two seasons in the national league.

She represented Scotland in athletics for the army cadets and won two gold medals in 2008/09 for shot putt and discus respectively. In 2008, Konkel gained her black belt in the martial art Goshin-Ryu Kempo.

Personal life 
Born in Inverness, and brought up on the Black Isle, Konkel grew up in a rugby family. She played with Inverness Craig Dunain Rugby Football Club, as did her mum, dad, and brothers.

Konkel is a vegan. She is also a qualified personal trainer, rugby coach, and gym instructor.

Away from Rugby Konkel is a Fire Fighter in London

References

External links 
 profile on Scottish Rugby

1993 births
Living people
Scotland women's international rugby union players
Scottish female rugby union players